A judge advocate general is a principal judicial officer for a military branch or the armed forces at large, typically the most senior judge advocate. 

Relevant articles include:
Judge Advocate General (Australia)
Judge Advocate General (Canada)
Defence Judge Advocate Corps (Denmark)
Judge Advocate General (India)
Military Advocate General (Israel)
Judge Advocate General Branch (Pakistan)
Judge Advocate General (Sri Lanka) 
Judge Advocate General (United Kingdom)
Judge Advocate General's Corps (United States) which is the judicial arm of any of the triune United States armed forces:
Judge Advocate General of the United States Army and his Corps
Judge Advocate General of the Navy and his Corps
United States Marine Corps Judge Advocate Division
Judge Advocate General of the Air Force and his Corps
United States Coast Guard Legal Division

See also
The Code (American TV series), a U.S.-produced television show based on the United States Marine Corps Judge Advocate General's Corps
JAG (TV series), a U.S.-produced television show based on the United States Navy's Judge Advocate General's Corps
Starfleet Judge Advocate General, an agency in the fictional Star Trek universe
Judge
Judge-advocate
Advocate general

Military justice